Nuraghe Su Mulinu is an archaeological site located in the territory of Villanovafranca, in the province of South Sardinia.

Description
The site is located less than a kilometer from the village, on a dorsal overlooking the Flumini Mannu.

It is a construction that dates back to 1800 BC, which has the peculiarity of being composed of different types of constructions such as a corridor Nuraghe (the oldest part of the building) and false dome towers. The site was later re-settled in the Punic, Roman and medieval eras. The false vaulted towers date to the recent Bronze Age and to the final Bronze Age (14th-12th century bc).

Inside a tower was found the only example of nuragic altar of the first Iron Age  (late 10th-early 8th century bc), consisting of a stone carved on vertical motifs with the eagerness of the moon goddess.
It was excavated several times since 1983 by archaeologist Giovanni Ugas.

References

Bibliography
G. Ugas, "Un nuovo contributo per lo studio della tholos in Sardegna. La fortezza di Su Mulinu-Villanovafranca", in Nuragic Sardinia and the mycenean world, 3, a cura di M. S. Balmuth, Oxford, BAR, 1987, pp. 77–128;
G. Ugas, "Il sacello del vano E nella fortezza nuragica di Su Mulinu-Villanovafranca (CA)", in Scienze dell'Antichità. Storia, Archeologia, Antropologia, 3–4, 1989–90, pp. 351–373;
G. Ugas-M.C. Paderi, "Persistenze rituali e cultuali di età punica e romana nel sacello nuragico del vano e della fortezza di Su Mulinu- Villanovafranca (CA)", in L'Africa romana. Atti del III convegno di studio (Sassari, 15-17 dicembre 1989), Sassari, 1990, pp. 475–479

Buildings and structures in Sardinia
Archaeological sites in Sardinia
Former populated places in Italy
Tourist attractions in Sardinia
Nuraghe